The  is a multi-purpose convention center, in the city of Nagoya, Aichi Prefecture, Japan.

The centre was constructed for the World Design Exhibition 1989 (世界デザイン博覧会). Other venues included Nagoya Castle and Nagoya Port.

It has 28 meeting rooms. The amount of exhibition space is 3,625 square metres.

Venues 
Century Hall: 3,000 seats
Event Hall: 1,480 seats
Shirotori Hall: 1,280 seats

Past events 
2010 Convention on Biological Diversity Congress
2013 T-ara Japan Tour 2013: Treasure Box

References

External links 

Buildings and structures in Nagoya
1989 establishments in Japan
Convention centers in Japan
Event venues established in 1989
Boxing venues in Japan
Music venues in Japan
Tourist attractions in Nagoya